The seventh World Masters Non-Stadia Athletics Championships were held in Manukau, Auckland and Rotorua, New Zealand, from April 18-24, 2004. The World Masters Athletics Championships serve the division of the sport of athletics for people over 35 years of age, referred to as masters athletics.

References 

World Masters Athletics Championships
World Masters Athletics Championships
International athletics competitions hosted by New Zealand
2004
April 2004 sports events in New Zealand